The 1972 Tanglewood International Tennis Classic was a men's tennis tournament held at Tanglewood Tennis Center in Clemmons, North Carolina in the United States that was part of the Grand Prix circuit and categorized as a Group D event. The tournament was played on outdoor clay courts and was held from July 25 through July 30, 1972. It was the second edition of the tournament and Bob Hewitt won the singles title and earned $5,000 first-prize money.

Finals

Singles
 Bob Hewitt defeated  Andrew Pattison 3–6, 6–3, 6–1
 It was Hewitt's 7th singles title of the year and the 32nd of his career in the Open Era.

Doubles
 Bob Hewitt /  Andrew Pattison defeated  Jim McManus /  Jim Osborne 6–4, 6–4

References

External links
 ITF tournament edition details

Tanglewood International Tennis Classic
Tanglewood International Tennis Classic
Tanglewood International Tennis Classic
Tanglewood International Tennis Classic
Rainier International Tennis Classic, 1972